Yuganthaya is a 1983 Sri Lankan drama film directed by Lester James Peries; it was adapted from the novel Yuganthaya by Martin Wickramasinghe, and deals with the beginning of labor unions in Sri Lanka. 

For the film, Lester won Sri Lanka's Presidential Award for best director. Critical reception was mixed however, and some critics found the film not up to par with the earlier films. It was entered into the 14th Moscow International Film Festival.

Plot
Simon Kabilana (Gamini Fonseka) is a powerful ruthless capitalist who uses terror to keep his workers under control and yield high production quotas. His son Malin (Richard De Zoysa) is the complete opposite, coming back from England idolizing Marx and Lenin, causing them to clash. Malin eventually gives up his fortunes in his father's company and works toward a confrontation with his father.

Cast
 Gamini Fonseka as Simon Kabilana 
 Suvineetha Weerasinghe as Nalika
 Richard De Zoysa as Malin
 Ramani Bartholomeusz as Chamari
 Mahal Wijewardena
 Punya Heendeniya
 Douglas Ranasinghe as Aravinda
 Chitra Wakishta
 Miyuri Samarasinghe

Production
The film was shot on 35mm and used eastmancolor.

References

External links
Official site of Lester James Peries

 

1983 films
1983 drama films
1980s Sinhala-language films
Films based on Sri Lankan novels
Films set in Sri Lanka (1948–present)
Sri Lankan drama films
Films based on works by Martin Wickramasinghe